The 2017 Tajik League is the 26th season of Tajik League, the Tajikistan Football Federation's top division of association football. FC Istiklol are the defending champions, having won the previous season.

Teams
On 8 February 2017, the Tajikistan Football Federation announced that the season would involve eight teams, with Khayr Vahdat, Parvoz and Ravshan dropping out of the league, and Panjshir gaining promotion.

Managerial changes

League table

Results 1–14

Results 15–21

Relegation play-offs

Matches

Week 1

Week 2

Week 3

Week 4

Week 5

Week 6

Week 7

Week 8

Week 9

Week 10

Week 11

Week 12

Week 13

Week 14

Week 15

Week 16

Week 17

Week 18

Week 19

Week 20

Week 21

Season statistics

Scoring
 First goal of the season: Hussein Umarov for Panjshir against Regar-TadAZ (5 March 2017)

Top scorers

Hat-tricks

References

External links
Football Federation of Tajikistan

Tajikistan Higher League seasons
1
Tajik